is a Japanese film director and illustrator.

Career 
Iwata is the director of the 2011 film Looking for a True Fiancee, which was based on a novel by Takami Itō.

References

External links
 
 Yuki Iwata at CinemaToday 

Japanese film directors
1972 births
Japanese illustrators
Living people